Grasshopper is an outdoor 1988 copper sculpture by Wayne Chabre, located in Salem, Oregon, United States.

Description and history
Wayne Chabre's Grasshopper, dedicated in 1988, depicts an insect of the same name, mounted in a head-down position on the exterior brick wall of a building at 455 Court Street Northeast. The brazed copper sculpture measures  x  x . It was surveyed and considered "treatment needed" by the Smithsonian Institution's "Save Outdoor Sculpture!" program in August 1993, and was administered by the City of Salem's Community Development department at that time.

See also

 1988 in art

References

External links
 Grasshopper, (sculpture) at Waymarking

1988 establishments in Oregon
1988 sculptures
Animal sculptures in Oregon
Copper sculptures in Oregon
Insects in art
Outdoor sculptures in Salem, Oregon
Sculptures by Wayne Chabre